Math-Tinik (stylized as MATH-Tinik) is a Philippine educational children's television series produced by the E-Media program of ABS-CBN Foundation (now the ABS-CBN Lingkod Kapamilya Foundation) and the Department of Education, Culture and Sports (DECS; now the Department of Education). The series was conceived by producer Gina Lopez to impart mathematics lessons to students through visual means. The series aired from January 7, 1997, to 2004.

Cast
Angela Garcia as Ms. Math-Tinik
Lorena Garcia as Sheila Mae
Huey Remulla as Charlie
Claudine Alejandro as Patricia
Mark Guayco as Joey

Introduced in 2000
Herbie Go as Artmetic

Production
The series' headwriters are Catherina Calzo-Fournier and Andrea Delos Reyes, with the former later becoming editor-in-chief of the Pinas newspaper. One of the episode directors is Rene Guidote, who has also directed Sine'skwela, Bayani, Pahina and other educational series made by ABS-CBN Foundation.
As with other educational television programs from the ABS-CBN Foundation and DECS, a single episode of Math-Tinik took between three to nine months to make from conception to approval.

Music
The "Math-Tinik Theme" was sung by Cris Villonco, with lyrics by Ting-ting Calzo-Fournier and music composed by Jungee Marcelo. The series composers were Noel Argosino, Froilan Malimban, and Noel Manalo, who also provided sound effects for the series.

In the 1999 episode "Numeration", the song "Numerals" was composed by Liezel Ann Tiamzon. In the 2000 episode "Time and Calendar", the song "Time and Calendar" was also composed by Tiamzon, sung by Caloy Santos Jr.

See also
Sine'skwela
Hiraya Manawari
Bayani
Epol/Apple

References

1997 Philippine television series debuts
2004 Philippine television series endings
1990s Philippine television series
ABS-CBN original programming
Children's education television series
Filipino-language television shows
Mathematics education television series
Philippine children's television series
Philippine educational television series
Philippine television shows featuring puppetry
Science education television series